Tomás Beswick (17 October 1911 – 27 July 1980) was an Argentine sprinter. He competed in the men's 100 metres at the 1936 Summer Olympics.

References

1911 births
1980 deaths
Athletes (track and field) at the 1936 Summer Olympics
Argentine male sprinters
Olympic athletes of Argentina
20th-century Argentine people